Virtue for Sale (translit. Akhlaq li - l bay or Akhlaq lil bai, aliases: Ethics for Sale or Little Virtues)  is a 1950 Egyptian film  directed by and starring Mahmoud Zulfikar. The supporting cast includes Faten Hamama and Mimi Chakib. The film is based on Yusuf Sibai story under the name Land of Hypocrisy.

Synopsis
In a fantasy, the film revolves around a husband who is suffering from his mother-in-law until he encounters a man who sells morality in powders.  He buys the powder of courage to face his powerful mother-in-law and changes his life.  He decides to go back to the seller and ask for new ones.

Crew 

 Directed by: Mahmoud Zulfikar
 Story: Yusuf Sibai
 Screenplay: Abo El Seoud El Ebiary
 Cinematography: Celilio
 Editing: Albert Naguib
 Producer: Mahmoud Zulfikar
 Production studio: Mahmoud Zulfikar films – Aziza Amir films
 Distribution: Bahna films

Cast 

 Mahmoud Zulfikar: (Ahmad)
 Faten Hamama: (Amina)
 Mimi Chakib: (Amina's mother)
 Mahmoud Shokoko: (Bulbul)
 Ali al-Kassar: (the seller of morals)
 Shafiq Noureddine: (Cohen the owner of the pension)
 Kitty: (Dancer Katina)
 Ali Abdel-Aal: (Katina's father)
 Abdel Hamid Zaki: (Director)
 Zaki Ibrahim: (Amina's uncle)
 Aliya Fawzy: (Maid Amina and Ahmed)
 Toson Metemed: (Hospital nurse)
 Mohammed Sobeih: (the thief)
 Abdel Moneim Bassiouni: (employee)
 Mohsen Hassanein: (the drunk customer)

References

External links 

 

Egyptian black-and-white films
1950 films
Egyptian fantasy films
1950s Arabic-language films
1950s fantasy films